Angophora floribunda, commonly known as the rough-barked apple, is a common woodland and forest tree of the family Myrtaceae native to Eastern Australia. Reaching 30 m (100 ft) high, it is a large tree with fibrous bark and cream-white flowers that appear over the Austral summer. It grows on alluvial soils on floodplains and along watercourses. Much of the land it grew on has been cleared for agriculture.

Description

Angophora floribunda  is a large, wide, spreading tree growing to a height of 30 m (100 ft). The trunk is often gnarled and crooked with fibrous grey bark. Like all members of the genus Angophora, the dull to glossy green leaves are arranged oppositely along the stem.  5.5 to 15 cm (2.2–6 in) long and 1–5 cm (0.4–2 in) wide, they are lanceolate to ovate and attached to the stems by  0.6–1.5 cm (0.2–0.6 in) long petioles. The leaves in the western parts of the range are narrower than those in more coastal regions. The cream-white flowers appear from November to March.

It can be confused with A. subvelutina, but the latter has leaves that are heart-shaped at their base and lacking petioles, arise from the stem.

Taxonomy
The rough-barked apple was described by James Edward Smith in 1797 as Metrosideros floribunda, having been collected by Surgeon-General of New South Wales, John White in 1794. It was growing from seed in Empress Josephine's arboretum at Malmaison by 1804, when Étienne Pierre Ventenat catalogued it in his  Jardin de la Malmaison. The species name is derived from the Latin floribunda "abundant flowers". Robert Sweet gave it its current name in 1830. Common names include rough-barked apple, apple box, rusty gum, gum myrtle and Boondah.

Genetic work has been published showing Angophora to be more closely related to Eucalyptus than Corymbia, and in 2000 botanist Ian Brooker coined the name Eucalyptus florida  for this species as Eucalyptus floribunda and E. intermedia had already been used for other eucalypts.

This tree hybridises with the broad-leaved apple (Angophora subvelutina). Genetic analysis suggests the two might be a single species, despite their different morphology. Hybridization is present in some populations both taxa occur but not others. The Charmhaven apple (Angophora inopina) from the vicinity of Wyee on the Central Coast of New South Wales is closely related and may be a dwarf form of A. floribunda.

Distribution and habitat
The range is across eastern Australia, from Rolleston and Roma in central Queensland though eastern and central New South Wales and into eastern Victoria, where it is found at Mallacoota. It is found on alluvial soils, generally on shale or basalt soils. In open forest, it is associated with such trees as swamp she-oak (Casuarina glauca), white stringybark (Eucalyptus globoidea), blackbutt (E. pilularis), Blakelys red gum (E. blakelyi), forest red gum (E. tereticornis), brittle gum (E. mannifera), forest she-oak (Allocasuarina torulosa), grey gum (E. punctata), broad-leaved white mahogany (E. umbra), while in wetter forest, it grows alongside Sydney blue gum (E. saligna) and closed forest alongside lillypilly (Syzygium smithii), cheese tree (Glochidion ferdinandi), Australian white birch (Schizomeria ovata) and sandpaper fig (Ficus coronata) and under emergent specimens of bangalay (E. botryoides), grey ironbark (E. paniculata) and turpentine (Syncarpia glomulifera).

Ecology
The rough-barked apple regenerates by regrowing from epicormic buds after bushfire. Trees live for more than a hundred years. The grey-headed flying fox (Pteropus poliocephalus) and little red flying fox (P. scapulatus) eat the flowers, and the white-plumed honeyeater (Lichenostomus penicillatus) forages among the flowers. The tree is used as a nesting site by the rare regent honeyeater  (Xanthomyza phrygia). The jewel beetle species Curis caloptera, Stigmodera andersoni, S. terminatis and S. vigilans also visit the flowers, the latter three species being fairly specific in their preference for Angophora floribunda. The longhorn beetle species Paroplites australis and Agrianome spinicollis have been recorded from the rough-barked apple.

Angophora floribunda has been recorded as a host for several mistletoe species Amyema bifurcata, A. miquelii, A. pendula, Dendrophthoe curvata, D. glabrescens, D. vitellina, Muellerina celastroides and M. eucalyptoides.

Female scarlet myzomelas (Myzomela sanguinolenta) have been observed tearing off bark to use in building their nests.

Cultivation
This is a large plant generally unsuitable for any but the largest gardens.

Gallery

References

floribunda
Flora of New South Wales
Flora of Queensland
flora of Victoria (Australia)
Trees of Australia
Ornamental trees
Plants described in 1797